William Huskisson  (11 March 177015 September 1830) was a British statesman, financier, and Member of Parliament for several constituencies, including Liverpool.

He is commonly known as the world's first widely reported railway passenger casualty as he was run over and fatally wounded by Robert Stephenson's pioneering locomotive Rocket.

Background and education
Huskisson was born at Birtsmorton Court, Malvern, Worcestershire, the son of William and Elizabeth Huskisson, both members of Staffordshire families. He was one of four brothers. After their mother Elizabeth died, their father William eventually remarried and had further children by his second wife.

Early life
Huskisson was a student at Appleby Grammar School (later renamed Sir John Moore Church of England Primary School), a boarding school designed by Sir Christopher Wren on the Leicestershire/Derbyshire borders. In 1783, he was sent to Paris to live with his maternal great-uncle Dr. Richard Gem, who was physician to the British embassy there. He remained in Paris until 1792, and his experience as an eyewitness to the prelude and beginning of the French Revolution gave him a lifelong interest in politics. Huskisson first came to public notice while still in Paris. As a supporter of the moderate party, he became a member of the "Club of 1789", which favoured making France into a constitutional monarchy. On 29 August 1790, he delivered a speech entitled "Sur les Assignats", about the issue of assignats by the French government. This speech gave him a reputation as an expert in finance. From 1790 to 1792, the Marquess of Stafford was the British ambassador to Paris. Huskisson became a protégé of the Marquess, and returned to London with him.

Political career

Once in London, Huskisson quickly gained an additional two powerful political patrons: Henry Dundas, the Home Secretary, and William Pitt the Younger, the Prime Minister. Because of Huskisson's fluency in French, Dundas appointed him in January 1793 to oversee the execution of the Aliens Act, which mostly dealt with French refugees. In the discharge of his delicate duties, he manifested such ability that in 1795 he was appointed Under-Secretary at War (the Secretary at War's deputy).

In the following year he entered Parliament as member for Morpeth, but for a considerable period he took scarcely any part in the debates. In 1800 he inherited a fortune from Dr Gem. On the retirement of Pitt in 1801 he resigned office, and after contesting Dover unsuccessfully he withdrew for a time into private life. Having in 1804 been chosen to represent Liskeard, he was appointed secretary of the treasury on the restoration of the Pitt ministry, holding office till the dissolution of the ministry after the death of Pitt in January 1806.

After being elected for Harwich in 1807, he accepted the same office under the Duke of Portland, but he withdrew from the ministry along with Canning in 1809. In the following year he published a pamphlet on the currency system, which confirmed his reputation as the ablest financier of his time; but his free-trade principles did not accord with those of his party. In 1812 he was returned for Chichester.

When in 1814 he re-entered the public service, it was only as First Commissioner of Woods and Forests, but his influence was from this time very great in the commercial and financial legislation of the country. He took a prominent part in the debates over the Corn Laws in 1814 and 1815; and in 1819 he presented a memorandum to Lord Liverpool advocating a large reduction in the unfunded debt, and explaining a method for the resumption of cash payments, which was embodied in the act passed the same year. In 1821 he was a member of the committee appointed to inquire into the causes of the agricultural distress then prevailing, and the proposed relaxation of the Corn Laws embodied in the report was understood to have been chiefly due to his strenuous advocacy.

In 1823 he was appointed President of the Board of Trade and Treasurer of the Navy, and shortly afterwards he received a seat in the cabinet. In the same year he was returned for Liverpool as successor to Canning, and as the only man who could reconcile the Tory merchants to a free trade policy. Among the more important legislative changes with which he was principally connected were a reform of the Navigation Acts, admitting other nations to a full equality and reciprocity of shipping duties; the repeal of the labour laws; the introduction of a new sinking fund; the reduction of the duties on manufactures and on the importation of foreign goods, and the repeal of the quarantine duties.

As a Secretary for Colonies in 1826, he proposed the revised Consolidated Slave Law which was accepted by Parliament and passed by the Barbadian legislature.

In 1826 after the Power-loom riots, a number of manufacturers subsequently agreed to pay a standard rate to the weavers, but on their own admission it was a "starvation" wage. Those who stuck to the agreement found it difficult to compete with those manufacturers who did not, and could therefore undercut them, 
prompting an appeal to William Huskisson, the President of the Board of Trade, to introduce a legally binding minimum wage. Huskisson's response was dismissive, expressing his view that to introduce such a measure would be "a vain and hazardous attempt to impose the authority of the law between the labourer and his employer in regulating the demand for labour and the price to be paid for it".

In accordance with his suggestion Canning in 1827 introduced a measure on the corn laws proposing the adoption of a sliding scale to regulate the amount of duty. A misapprehension between Huskisson and the Duke of Wellington led to the duke proposing an amendment, the success of which caused the abandonment of the measure by the government.

After the death of Canning in the same year Huskisson accepted the secretaryship of the colonies under Lord Goderich, an office which he continued to hold in the new cabinet formed by the Duke of Wellington in the following year. After succeeding with great difficulty in inducing the cabinet to agree to a compromise on the corn laws, Huskisson finally resigned office in May 1828 on account of a difference with his colleagues in regard to the disfranchisement of East Retford.

He was followed out of the government by other Tories who are usually described as Canningites including Lord Palmerston, Charles Grant, Lord Dudley, and Lord Melbourne.

Death

Huskisson had been diagnosed with strangury, a tender inflammation of the kidneys. He had undergone surgery, and had been advised by Royal doctor William George Maton to cancel all forthcoming appointments, which included the opening of the Liverpool and Manchester Railway. Huskisson chose to ignore this advice, believing the opening event too important to cancel.  He rode down the line in a special train constructed for the Duke of Wellington and his guests and dignitaries, pulled by the locomotive Northumbrian which was driven by George Stephenson himself. This train was the only train on the south track; the other seven were in procession on the northern track.  At Parkside railway station, near the midpoint of the line, the locomotives made a scheduled stop to take on fuel and water. Although the company had implicitly warned passengers to remain on the trains while this took place, around fifty of the dignitaries on board alighted when the Duke of Wellington's special train stopped. One of those who got off was Huskisson, who approached the Duke to take this opportunity to repair their relationship after a great falling out, which resulted in Huskisson leaving the government, and shook his hand.

At this time the train being pulled by Rocket approached on the other line. Rocket was being driven by Joseph Locke, George Stephenson's assistant and future eminent engineer in his own right. A shout went up, "An engine is approaching. Take care, gentlemen!" The other disembarked passengers either climbed back into their seats, or stepped over the northern line and completely out of the way. A third option was available, to stand with one's back to the stationary coaches, as there was a four-foot gap between the lines, and even though the Duke's private carriage was wider than a then-standard carriage, it would have still been possible to stand between the stationary train and the travelling train and remain safe. However, what unfolded was a calamitous series of events. Huskisson was known to be clumsy, and had endured a long list of problems from his regular trips and falls; he had twice broken his arm and never fully recovered the use of it. Added to this, he was only a few weeks post surgery and was present against his doctor's advice.

On realising his danger he panicked and made two attempts to cross the other line, but changed his mind and returned to the Duke's carriage. At this point Joseph Locke became aware and threw Rocket into reverse, but it would have taken ten seconds to have any effect. Huskisson then panicked that the gap between the two trains was not big enough and so tried to clamber into the Duke's carriage. However, the carriage door had not been latched, and so it slowly swung open, leaving him hanging directly in the path of the oncoming Rocket, which hit the door, throwing Huskisson onto the tracks in front of the train.  His leg was horrifically mangled by the locomotive.

A door was ripped from a railway building and Huskisson was placed on it, and George Stephenson uncoupled Northumbrian from the Duke's train and coupled it to a small carriage that had been occupied by a band; the mortally wounded MP was placed inside with a small group of friends. They set off to Eccles and walked from the station to the vicarage, where a doctor was called. A tourniquet had been applied, but it was not deemed possible to do a field amputation, so he was made comfortable with the assistance of the vicar's wife Emma Blackburne, whose "activity, sense & conduct" were mentioned in The Manchester Courier and The Times and remembered with gratitude by Huskisson's widow Emily who arrived at the vicarage from Liverpool. Huskisson was able to make his will and at 9 pm he finally succumbed to his injury.

The death and funeral of Huskisson led to wide reporting on the opening of the railway, for the first time making people around the world aware that cheap and rapid long-distance transport was now possible, if dangerous.

Family and commemorations
On 6 April 1799, Huskisson married Emily Milbanke, the younger daughter of Mark Milbanke, the commander-in-chief at Portsmouth. Emily Huskisson survived her husband and did not remarry, dying in April 1856. They had no children. In 1800 Huskisson bought Eartham House in West Sussex from his friend William Hayley, and is commemorated in the parish church by a long carved eulogy from Emily on the south wall.

The monument where his remains are buried is the centrepiece of St James Cemetery, Liverpool. A marble statue of him was housed in a mausoleum there until 1968, when it was transferred to the Walker Art Gallery in Liverpool.

Emily also commissioned a second marble statue for the Custom House in Liverpool.  This statue now stands in Pimlico Gardens in London, between Grosvenor Road and the river Thames. A bronze casting of it was unveiled at the Custom House in 1847 and, after several moves, is now in Duke Street in Liverpool city centre.

the town of Huskisson, New South Wales was named after Huskisson by the 9th Governor of New South Wales, Sir George Gipps

See also
 Lists of rail accidents
 Huskisson, New South Wales, a town named after William Huskisson
 List of statues and sculptures in Liverpool
 Consolidated Slave Law

References

Sources

Bibliography

Further reading

 Brady, Alexander, William Huskisson and liberal reform; an essay on the changes in economic policy in the twenties of the nineteenth century, Oxford, OUP, 1928. (2nd ed. London, Cass, 1967).

External links 
 
 William Huskisson page on the Peel Web.
 
 A Piece of Lowton History has information about Huskisson's death and memorial.

|-

|-

1770 births
1830 deaths
People from Eccles, Greater Manchester
People from Malvern, Worcestershire
Members of the Parliament of the United Kingdom for Liverpool
Members of the Parliament of Great Britain for Morpeth
British MPs 1796–1800
Members of the Parliament of the United Kingdom for constituencies in Cornwall
UK MPs 1801–1802
UK MPs 1802–1806
UK MPs 1806–1807
UK MPs 1807–1812
UK MPs 1812–1818
UK MPs 1818–1820
UK MPs 1820–1826
UK MPs 1826–1830
Secretaries of State for War and the Colonies
Members of the Privy Council of the United Kingdom
Railway accident deaths in England
Railway accidents in 1830
Leaders of the House of Commons of the United Kingdom
Members of the Parliament of the United Kingdom for Morpeth
Presidents of the Board of Trade
People from Chichester District